Svetlana Slapšak (born 18 January 1948 in Belgrade) is a Slovenian anthropologist, classical philologist, writer, and historian. She has authored the books Svi Grci nazad! : eseji o helenizmu u novijoj srpskoj književnost (1985), Ogledi o bezbrižnosti : srpski intelektualci, nacionalizam i jugoslovenski rat (1994), Leon in Leonina ali Zgodba o vztrajnosti (1997), Ženske ikone antičkog sveta (2006), Zelje in spolnost : iz zgodovinske antropologije hrane : študija o kultni, ritualni in kulturni vlogi zelja (2013), and Antička miturgija : žene (2013). She was nominated for the Nobel Peace Prize in 2005.

In 2017, Slapšak has signed the Declaration on the Common Language of the Croats, Serbs, Bosniaks and Montenegrins.

References 

1948 births
Living people
Slovenian anthropologists
Slovenian historians
Slovenian writers
Slovenian philologists
Signatories of the Declaration on the Common Language